Hyde Bay is a bay located on Otsego Lake. The historic Hyde Bay Camp was located on the shores of Hyde Bay. Hyde Bay is the location on the lake where General Clinton and his men landed on their way to Cooperstown.

References

Landforms of Otsego County, New York